The orange-bellied fruit dove (Ptilinopus iozonus) is a small (21 cm in length) pigeon with mainly green plumage, distinguished by a large orange patch on the lower breast and belly, a small lilac shoulder patch, pale yellow undertail coverts, and a grey terminal band on the tail.

Taxonomy and systematics

Subspecies 

 P. i. humeralis – Wallace, 1862: 
 P. i. jobiensis – Schlegel, 1873: 
 P. i. pseudohumeralis – Rand, 1938:
 P. i. finschi – Mayr, 1931:
 P. i. iozonus – Gray, 1858:

Distribution and habitat

The dove is found in New Guinea, the Aru Islands and western Papuan islands where it inhabits lowland rainforest, secondary forest and mangroves.  It has been recorded from Boigu Island, Queensland, Australian territory in northern Torres Strait.

Behaviour

Feeding
The dove eats the fruit from forest trees, mainly figs.

Breeding
The dove lays a single egg on a platform of small sticks high in a forest tree.

References

 Beehler, Bruce M.; & Finch, Brian W. (1985). Species Checklist of the Birds of New Guinea. RAOU Monograph No.1. Royal Australasian Ornithologists Union: Melbourne. 
 Beehler, Bruce M.; Pratt, Thane K.; & Zimmerman, Dale A. (1986). Birds of New Guinea. Wau Ecology Handbook No.9. Princeton University Press. 
 BirdLife International. (2006). Species factsheet: Ptilinopus iozonus. Downloaded from http://www.birdlife.org on 1 February 2007
 Coates, Brian J. (1985). The Birds of Papua New Guinea. Volume 1: Non-Passerines. Dover Publications: Alderley, Queensland. 

orange-bellied fruit dove
Birds of the Aru Islands
Birds of New Guinea
orange-bellied fruit dove
orange-bellied fruit dove